Dharga Town (Sinhala:දර්ගා නගරය Tamil: தர்கா நகரம் ) is a town located in Kalutara District, Western Province, Sri Lanka. Governed by the Beruwala Urban council under the Government of Sri Lanka. Dharga Town  is close to Aluthgama and the tourist town Bentota.

Etymology
The name Dharga Town was derived after the Dharga of Sheik Hassan Bin Osman Magodoomy (Rali)'s shrine, which traces its origin to around 1866 AD, when he was enshrined in his home town. The town was named Dharga Town by the Muslims in the 1940s.

History
While the first Sri Lankan Muslim settlement was considered Beruwala also known as Berbereen which was founded by Abu Yusuf al-Barbari, a Berber Traveler, the Second Muslim settlement was in the town called Dharga town which was then called as Alutgamaweedia.

Demographics 
Dharga Town is a Muslim majority town. Sinhalese are sizable minority. There is also small numbers of Tamils.

Education
Dharga Town has three Government Muslim Schools such as Zahira College Dharga Town (One of the oldest schools in Dharga Town), Al Hambra Maha Vidyalaya and Aluthgamveediya Muslims Ladies National School along with other Government Preliminary Schools and Private Schools. One of the Teacher-training College of the Government is also situated in Dharga Town named, Dharga Nagar National College of Education.

Government Schools
KL-Zahira College
KL-Al Hambra Maha Vidyalaya
KL-Aluthgamveediya Muslims Ladies National School
KL-Pathirajagoda Preliminary School
Sri Gnanissara Maha Vidyalaya

Private Schools
Alif International School
Bambridge International School

Arabic College
Ilharul Islam Arabic College

Orphanage
Isha Athul Islam Child Development Centre

Government Teachers-training College
Dharga Nagar National College of Education

Population
Majority of the population are Sri Lankan Muslims, while Sinhalese and Tamils make up the rest of 20540 (including Seenawatha 765-A and Welipitiya 768-A)

Buddhist temples
 Kurundhuwaththa Buddhist Temple
 Pathirajagoda Temple

Masjids
 Sheik Hassan Bin Osman Magdoomy (Rali) Dharga Mosque  
 Mohideen Jumma Masjid (Also known as the Grand Mosque, Periya Palli)
 Meera Masjid (Also known as the Theruwu Palli)
 Darul Huda (Thowheed Masjid)
 Mihiripenna Jummah Masjid
 Welipitiya Jummah Masjid
 Masjid al Noor (Marikkar Street)
 Masjid al Rahman Jummah Masjid (Marikkar Street)
 Siyad Marikkar Masjid (Mihiripenna road)
 Masjid al Muslimeen
 Sheikh Madar Masjid
 Adhikaragoda Masjid
 Mokaladi Masjid
 Haji lane masjid

Sports

Soccer and cricket clubs
 Young Men's Sports Club (YMSC) (Estd. 1969)
Zaviya Sports Club (Founded 1973)
Red Star FC
Dharga Youth Sports Club
Golden Rise Sports Club
Pentagon Cricket Club
Liverpool Sports Club
Sorbus Cricket Club (1st ranked) 
Royal Kings Cricket Club
Red Alert Cricket Sport Club (2nd ranked)
Dharga Town United SC (1989)
Victorians Cricket Club

Public ground
Bakeer Markar Stadium

Infrastructure

Railway
The Aluthgama Railway Station is located on the Coastal Line, connecting Colombo to Matara and Beliatta.

Road
Dharga Town is served by the B157 Aluthgama – Mathugama road in Sri Lanka.

Bus
Dharga Town has an extensive public transport system based on buses operated both by private operators and the government-owned Sri Lanka Transport Board (SLTB) along the B157 Aluthgama – Mathugama road and the closest main bus stand is Aluthgama Bus Stand situated in the A2 highway.

Auto rickshaws
Auto rickshaws also known as Three wheelers are entirely operated by individuals and hardly regulated whilst some are metered.

Private Taxi
There are many private taxi's operated by individuals which includes Van's and Car's mostly parked in the Taxi stands in the town.

References

Populated places in Kalutara District